Alfred Spencer was an English amateur footballer who made one appearance in the Football League for Clapton Orient as an inside right.

Personal life 
Spencer served as a private in the British Army in India and during the First World War. He was wounded twice during the war and was listed as a prisoner of war in May 1918.

References

English footballers
English Football League players
Leyton Orient F.C. players
Year of death missing
British Army personnel of World War I
Association football inside forwards
British World War I prisoners of war
Year of birth missing
Place of birth missing
British Army soldiers